The Journal of the Evangelical Theological Society is a refereed theological journal published by the Evangelical Theological Society. It was first published in 1958 as the Bulletin of the Evangelical Theological Society, and was given its present name in 1969. It is a "major journal of conservative American theology."

History 
The journal has been published continuously since 1958. The first issue of the Bulletin contained a single article, Ned B. Stonehouse's presidential address to the society's annual meeting, entitled "The Infallibility of Scripture and Evangelical Progress." In 1969 the publication attained its present title. In 1988 the circulation was approximately 2500; by 2016 it had increased to 5000. The society provides free online access to digitized back issues. For 22 years until 2021, the editor was Andreas J. Köstenberger; Dorian Coover-Cox succeeded him.

Contents and outlook
The Evangelical Theological Society is composed of Christians who affirm the inerrancy of the Bible. The journal is focused predominantly on biblical studies. In its early years, it provided a venue for evangelicals questioning dispensationalism. While at first sympathetic to neo-orthodoxy and the work of Karl Barth, it turned sharply against Barth in the mid-1960s.

Editors 
Editors without a direct reference were compiled by referencing the JETS archives.

References

External links 
 
 Archives in PDF format 

Academic journals published by learned and professional societies
English-language journals
Publications established in 1958
Quarterly journals
Protestant studies journals